Henry Yarburgh Everett (1791 – 7 May 1847) was a British amateur cricketer.

He was mainly associated with Marylebone Cricket Club (MCC) and he made 10 known appearances in first-class matches from 1812 to 1839.

References

1791 births
1847 deaths
English cricketers
English cricketers of 1787 to 1825
English cricketers of 1826 to 1863
Marylebone Cricket Club cricketers
Hampshire cricketers
Gentlemen cricketers
William Ward's XI cricketers
George Osbaldeston's XI cricketers